Kyzylkak is a bittern salt lake in Ertis District, Pavlodar Region, Kazakhstan.

There are no settlements by the lakeshore.

Geography
Kyzylkak is an endorheic lake located in the Ishim Plain, south of the Russian border. It lies in the lowest part of a large depression and its shores are very steep. The bottom of the lake has a thick layer of black mud containing magnesium salts and releasing Hydrogen sulphide. Lake Kyzylkak is fed mainly by snow, but owing to its high salinity it does not freeze in the winter.

The Birsuat, Agynsay and Aksuat are the main rivers flowing into the lake.

See also
List of lakes of Kazakhstan

References

External links

Lakes of Kazakhstan
Endorheic lakes of Asia
Pavlodar Region
West Siberian Plain